This is a list of recurring actors on the US television show Journeyman.

Main cast 
This list shows the show's main cast, and the number of episodes for which each actor has been credited in. Normally the actors are only credited in the episodes which they appear in — exceptions to this are noted below.

Guest stars 
This is a list of guest stars as well as recurring characters.

Lists of actors by drama television series
Lists of actors by science fiction television series